Shimonia is a genus of moths in the family Metarbelidae. The genus was described by Ingo Lehmann and Hossein Rajaei in 2013.

Species
 Shimonia fischeri Lehmann & Rajaei, 2013
 Shimonia oyiekeae Lehmann & Rajaei, 2013
 Shimonia splendida (D. S. Fletcher, 1968)
 Shimonia timberlakei Lehmann & Rajaei, 2013

Etymology
The genus is named for Shimoni Lehmann, the son of the senior author.

References

Lehmann, I. & Rajaei Sh., H. (2013) "Description of a new genus and three new species of Metarbelidae (Lepidoptera, Cossoidea) from East and Central Africa, with notes on biogeography". Bonn Zoological Bulletin, 62 (1): 100–110.

External links

Metarbelinae